Football Club Lubumbashi Sport are a football club from the DR Congo. They currently play in the DR Congo top domestic league Linafoot. Their home games are held in the Stade Frederic Kibassa Maliba in Lubumbashi.

Performance in CAF competitions
African Cup Winners' Cup: 1 appearances
1981 – First Round

References

External links
 Club profile - Soccerway.com
Club logo

Football clubs in the Democratic Republic of the Congo
Football clubs in Lubumbashi
Association football clubs established in 1929
1929 establishments in the Belgian Congo